Qaidi (meaning The Prisoner) is a Bollywood film directed by S.F. Hasnain. It was released in 1940. It stars Madhuri and Mehtab and Ramola Devi.

References

External links
 

1940 films
1940s Hindi-language films
Indian black-and-white films